Fârțănești is a commune in Galați County, Western Moldavia, Romania with a population of 5,283 people. It is composed of two villages, Fârțănești and Viile.

References

Communes in Galați County
Localities in Western Moldavia